Larissa Nusser (born 8 February 2000) is a Dutch handball player for Odense Håndbold and the Dutch national team.

She represented the Netherlands at the 2019 World Women's Handball Championship.

References

External links

2000 births
Living people
Dutch female handball players
People from Born, Netherlands
Expatriate handball players
Dutch expatriate sportspeople in Denmark
Handball players at the 2020 Summer Olympics
Sportspeople from Limburg (Netherlands)
21st-century Dutch women